Pekka Juhani Vapaavuori  (born 6 August 1962, in Turku) is a Finnish architect. He graduated from the Tampere University of Technology in 1993 and started his own architect office in Turku in 1994. Among his realizations is the Kumu Art Museum, in Tallinn, Estonia.

References
 Art Museum of Estonia

External links
 
 Arkkitehtitoimisto Vapaavuori Oy – company home page

Finnish architects
Living people
1962 births
People from Turku